Taleni Seu (born 26 December 1993) is a New Zealand rugby union player who currently plays as a lock or loose forward for  in New Zealand's domestic Mitre 10 Cup and Toyota Industries Shuttles in Japan.

Early career

Born in Auckland and raised in Mangere, Seu attended school at Onehunga High School in the city's suburbs where he played first XV rugby as well as playing for the school's basketball team.   After graduating from high school, he joined the Auckland academy and went on to play for them at under-18, under-19 and 'B' level while playing his club rugby for Grammar TEC.

Senior career

Despite originally not being named in the Auckland squad for the 2015 ITM Cup, Seu was called up as injury cover and managed to force his way into the team over the course the season. A full squad member in 2016, he made a further 7 Mitre 10 Cup appearances what turned out to be a disappointing campaign overall for Auckland, which ended up with them finishing outside of the play-off places, in 5th position. It was announced in April 2019 that Taleni will be joining Waikato in the Mitre 10 Cup in the 2019 season.

Super Rugby

An impressive debut season in provincial rugby was enough to earn Seu a Super Rugby contract with the Hamilton-based  for the 2016 Super Rugby season. He was retained in the squad for 2017.

Super Rugby Statistics

References

1993 births
Living people
New Zealand rugby union players
Rugby union locks
Rugby union flankers
Auckland rugby union players
Rugby union players from Auckland
Chiefs (rugby union) players
New Zealand sportspeople of Tongan descent
New Zealand sportspeople of Samoan descent
New Zealand people of Niuean descent
People educated at Onehunga High School
People from Māngere
Toyota Industries Shuttles Aichi players
Samoan rugby union players
Samoa international rugby union players
New South Wales Waratahs players